Born to Win G20 Ambedo is a professional Women's road bicycle racing team based in Italy.

Team roster

References

Cycling teams based in Italy
UCI Women's Teams
Cycling teams established in 2021